The South Branch Pawtuxet River is a river in the U.S. state of Rhode Island. There are 11 dams along the river's length.

Course
The river is formed by the confluence of the Big and Flat rivers in the area now flooded by the Flat River Reservoir in Coventry. From there, it flows east and then northeast through Coventry and the historic textile mill villages of Anthony, Quidnick, Crompton, Centreville, Arctic and River Point West Warwick where it converges with the North Branch Pawtuxet River to form the main branch of the Pawtuxet River.

Crossings
Below is a list of all crossings over the South Branch Pawtuxet River. The list starts at the headwaters and goes downstream:

Tributaries
The Mishnock River and Hawkinson Brook are the South Branch Pawtuxet River's only named tributaries, though it has many unnamed streams that also feed it.

See also
List of rivers in Rhode Island
Flat River
Big River
Mishnock River
North Branch Pawtuxet River
Pawtuxet River

References
Maps from the United States Geological Survey

Rivers of Kent County, Rhode Island
West Warwick, Rhode Island
Coventry, Rhode Island
Rivers of Rhode Island
Tributaries of Providence River